Udell may refer to:

 Udell, Iowa
 Udell Township
 Florence Udell
 Jake Udell
 John Udell
 Jon Udell